Acul Bay, also known as North Acul Bay, is a bay on the northern coast of Haiti north of the city of Acul-du-Nord and west of the city of Cap-Haïtien.

Geography 
Acul Bay is open to the ocean on the North. It extends from the tip of Labadee to the East of Cape Balimbé West.

Out from the bay, many shoals emerge, forming numerous islets that are dangerous to navigation. Many shipwrecks dating back several centuries are stranded or lying at the bottom of the water. Among these islands, Rat Island was also named l'île La Amiga (Friendly Island) by Christopher Columbus because he met Native Americans  there.

References

External links
Google Maps
Description de la baie de l'Acul (Description of Acul Bay) 

Bays of Haiti
Shipwrecks in the Caribbean Sea